David is a small crater on Mercury, which has a bright ray system.  Its name was adopted by the International Astronomical Union (IAU) in 2013. David is named for the French painter Jacques-Louis David.

The floor of David is a dark spot of low reflectance material (LRM), closely associated with hollows.

References

Impact craters on Mercury